If.... (stylised in lowercase) is a 1968 British satirical drama film produced and directed by Lindsay Anderson, and starring Malcolm McDowell as Mick Travis, and also starring Richard Warwick, Christine Noonan, David Wood, and Robert Swann. A satire of English public school life, the film follows a group of pupils who stage a savage insurrection at a boys' boarding school. The film was the subject of controversy at the time of its release, receiving an X certificate for its depictions of violence.

If.... won the Palme d'Or at the 1969 Cannes Film Festival.
In 1999, the British Film Institute named it the 12th greatest British film of the 20th century; in 2004, the magazine Total Film named it the 16th greatest British film of all time. In 2017 a poll of 150 actors, directors, writers, producers and critics for Time Out magazine ranked it the 9th best British film ever.
On Rotten Tomatoes, the film holds a 90% approval rating based on 49 reviews, with an average score of 7.9/10. According to the site's critical consensus, "Incendiary, subversive, and darkly humorous, If.... is a landmark of British countercultural cinema."

Plot 
The pupils return after the summer for a new Michaelmas term at a traditional British public school for boys in the late 1960s. Mick Travis arrives hiding his moustache, which he quickly shaves off. He, Wallace, and Knightly are three non-conformist boys in the lower sixth form, their penultimate year. They are watched and persecuted by the "Whips", upper sixth-formers given authority as prefects over the other boys. The junior boys are made to act as personal servants for the Whips, who discuss them as sex objects.

The headmaster is remote from the boys and the housemasters. The protagonists' housemaster, Mr. Kemp, is easily manipulated by the Whips into giving them free rein in enforcing discipline. Some schoolmasters are shown behaving bizarrely.

Mick and Johnny sneak off the school grounds and steal a motorbike from a showroom. They ride to a café staffed by an unnamed girl, about whom Mick fantasizes wrestling naked. Meanwhile, Wallace spends time with a younger boy, Bobby Philips, and later shares his bed.

The three boys drink vodka in their study and consider how one man holds the potential to "change the world with a bullet in the right place." Their clashes with school authorities become increasingly contentious. Eventually, a brutal caning by the Whips spurs them to action.

During a school Combined Cadet Force military drill, Mick acquires live ammunition, which he, Wallace, and Knightly use to open fire on a group of boys and masters, including Kemp and the school chaplain. When the latter orders the boys to drop their weapons, Mick assaults him and cows him into submission.

As punishment for their actions, the trio are ordered by the headmaster to clean out a large storeroom beneath the main school hall. They discover a cache of firearms, including automatic weapons and mortars. Joined by Philips and the girl from the café, they commit to revolt against the establishment.

On Founders' Day, when parents are visiting the school, the group starts a fire under the hall, smoking everyone out of the building. They then open fire on them from the rooftop. Led by a visiting General who had been giving a speech, the staff, students, and parents break open the Combined Cadet Force armoury and begin firing back. The headmaster tries to stop the fight, imploring the group to listen to reason. The girl shoots him between the eyes. The battle continues, and the camera closes in on Mick's face as he keeps firing.

Cast 

 Malcolm McDowell as Michael Arnold "Mick" Travis
 Richard Warwick as Wallace
 Christine Noonan as The Girl
 David Wood as Johnny Knightly
 Rupert Webster as Bobby Philips
 Robert Swann as Rowntree
 Peter Jeffrey as Headmaster
 Arthur Lowe as Mr. Kemp, Housemaster
 Mona Washbourne as Matron
 Ben Aris as John Thomas, Undermaster
 Robin Askwith as Keating
 Robin Davies as Machin
 Hugh Thomas as Denson
 Michael Cadman as Fortinbras
 Guy Ross as Stephans
 Martin Beaumont as Hunter
 John Garrie as Music master (uncredited)
 Philip Bagenal as Peanuts
 Charles Sturridge as Markland
 Graham Crowden as History master
 Tommy Godfrey as Finchley the school porter (uncredited)
 David Griffin as Willens
 Charles Lloyd-Pack as Classics master
 Simon Ward as schoolboy (uncredited)
 Richard Everett as Pussy Graves
 Ellis Dale as Motorcycle salesman (uncredited)
 Peter Sproule as Barnes
 Sean Bury as Jute
 Brian Pettifer as Biles
 Mary MacLeod as Mrs. Kemp, housemaster's wife
 Geoffrey Chater as Chaplain
 Anthony Nicholls as General Denson
 Michael Newport as Brunning
 Ray Mitchell as schoolboy (uncredited)

Production and locations 
David Sherwin's original title for the screenplay was Crusaders, during the writing of which he drew heavily from his experiences at Tonbridge School in Kent. In 1960, he and his friend and co-writer John Howlett took it to director Seth Holt. Holt felt unqualified to direct, but offered to produce the film. They also took it to Sherwin's hero, Rebel Without a Cause director Nicholas Ray, who liked it but had a nervous breakdown before anything came of it. Holt introduced Sherwin to Lindsay Anderson in a Soho pub.

The school used for the early filming on location was Anderson's alma mater, Cheltenham College, Gloucestershire, but this was not made public at the time under the agreement needed to shoot there. The then headmaster, David Ashcroft, persuaded the school governors to agree that the film could be made.

Aldenham School in Elstree, Hertfordshire, was used for later scenes filmed after previous summer commitments prevented further shooting at Cheltenham.

The sweat room scenes were filmed in the School Room in School House at Aldenham School (though they were redesigned for the film). The dormitory scenes were also at Aldenham—specifically The Long Room for the junior boys, and the room with the wooden partitions called Lower Cubs (short for cubicles). The shower scene and toilets were in School House changing rooms.

The transport cafe was the (now demolished) Packhorse Cafe on the A5/Watling Street in Kensworth, Dunstable, Bedfordshire, close to the Packhorse Pub.

The painting in the dining hall is of Aldenham School's founder, Richard Platt. The Hall scene was an amalgamation of the school halls at Cheltenham and Aldenham.

Carew Manor, in Beddington, Surrey, was used for the opening staircase scene and for several other scenes. It was filmed during the summer when the school had closed for holidays.

Some scenes were shot at the former Trinity School of John Whitgift in central Croydon, before it was demolished to make way for the Whitgift Centre; pupil extras from the separate Whitgift School were engaged at £5 per day.

Anderson originally approached Charterhouse School and later Cranleigh School for permission to shoot the film: negotiations were going well until the schools discovered the content of the film and pulled out.

The outside shots of the school including the final showdown on the roof were filmed at Cheltenham College after term ended.

The Speech Day interior was filmed inside St. John's Church on Albion Street, Cheltenham. The church was later demolished.

The motorbike shop was filmed at the Broadway Motor Company on Gladstone Road, Wimbledon.

The film makes use of black and white sequences. In the audio commentary to the 2007 DVD release, Malcolm McDowell confirmed that lighting the chapel scenes for colour filming would have taken much longer than for black and white. The time they could use the school chapel was limited, so Anderson opted to not shoot those scenes in colour. Liking the effect this gave, he then decided to shoot other sequences in black and white to improve the 'texture' of the film. As a child, he was impressed watching a gangster film which started in black and white and then turned to colour.

The black and white sequence featuring Mrs. Kemp (Mary MacLeod) walking naked through the school was allowed by the then Secretary of the Board of the British Board of Film Censors, John Trevelyan, on the condition that shots of male genitalia from the shower scene were removed.

Stephen Frears is credited as an assistant to the director, while Chris Menges is credited as a cameraman.

Music featured in the film includes the 'Sanctus', from the Missa Luba, a rendering of the Roman Latin mass sung to African beat by a Congolese choir.

Sources and influence 
The film's surrealist sequences have been compared to Jean Vigo's French classic Zéro de conduite (1933). Anderson acknowledged an influence, and described how he arranged a viewing of that film with his screenwriters, Sherwin and Howlett, at an early stage in production planning, though in his view the Vigo film's influence on If.... was structural rather than merely cosmetic. "Seeing Vigo's film gave us the idea and also the confidence to proceed with the kind of scene-structure that we devised for the first part of the film particularly."

McDowell's performance in If.... caught the attention of Stanley Kubrick, who subsequently cast him in his 1971 film adaptation of Anthony Burgess's A Clockwork Orange. Additionally, McDowell used his performance in If.... in his inspiration for the Clockwork Orange protagonist, Alexander DeLarge. Having been given the script by Kubrick, McDowell was unsure how he should play the part of Alex, and so he contacted Lindsay Anderson, asking for advice. McDowell relates the story:

Anyway, he said 'Malcolm, this is how you play the part: there is a scene of you, a close-up in If...., where you open the doors to the gymnasium, to be beaten. You get a close-up.' I said 'that's right.' He said 'do you remember...' I said 'yes. I smiled.' He said 'that's right. You gave them that smile. That sort of ironic smile,' he said 'and that's how you play Alex.' And I went 'my god, that's brilliant. That's brilliant.' That's all I needed and that was enough, and that is a brilliant piece of direction for an actor.

The movie also had influence in the popular Japanese Megami Tensei series, specifically with the game Shin Megami Tensei If... which references the movie not only in the title but the basic plot of a bullied kid revolting against his high-school bullies.

Critical reception
The film received mostly positive reviews from critics.

Sequels 
If.... is the first film in the "Mick Travis trilogy", all starring Malcolm McDowell as everyman character Mick Travis. The others are:
 O Lucky Man! (1973)
 Britannia Hospital (1982)
Those two movies do not follow the same continuity of the first film, and have little in common other than the main character of Mick Travis and several identically named characters in similar roles (on the commentary track for O Lucky Man!, Malcolm McDowell refers to it as a "so-called trilogy"). At the time of Anderson's death he had completed a final draft of a proper sequel to If...., but it was never made. The sequel takes place during a Founders' Day celebration at which many of the characters reunite. Mick Travis is now an Oscar-nominated movie star, eschewing England for Hollywood. Wallace is a military major who has lost his arm, Johnny is a clergyman, and Rowntree is the Minister of War. In the script, Rowntree is kidnapped by a group of anti-war students and saved by Mick and his gang, though not before Mick crucifies Rowntree with a large nail through his palm.

See also 
 BFI Top 100 British films

References

Bibliography

Further reading 
 Catterall, Ali; and Wells, Simon (2001). Your Face Here: British Cult Movies Since The Sixties. London: Fourth Estate.

External links 

 
 
 
 
If....: School Days an essay by David Ehrenstein at the Criterion Collection

1968 films
1960s coming-of-age drama films
1968 drama films
1960s high school films
1968 LGBT-related films
1960s teen drama films
British coming-of-age drama films
British high school films
British LGBT-related films
British satirical films
British teen drama films
Films about school violence
Films directed by Lindsay Anderson
Films partially in color
Films scored by Marc Wilkinson
Films set in England
Films shot in Gloucestershire
Films shot in Hertfordshire
Latin-language films
Palme d'Or winners
Paramount Pictures films
Surrealist films
Films set in boarding schools
1960s English-language films
1960s British films